İnanlı, historically Keferrahim, is a village in the Kilis District, Kilis Province, Turkey. The village had a population of 93 in 2022.

In late 19th century, the village was a settlement of 5 houses inhabited by Turks.

References

Villages in Kilis District